Stacey Chepkemboi Ndiwa (born 6 December 1992) is a Kenyan female long-distance runner who competes across cross country, track and road running disciplines. She was a gold medallist at the 2008 Commonwealth Youth Games in the 1500 metres and was a team silver medallist at the IAAF World Cross Country Championships in 2015, where she was fifth individually. She was also a bronze medallist in the 1500 m at the 2011 African Junior Athletics Championships.

Ndiwa competed for the Kenya Police team, and won the team championships in the 5000 metres in 2013 and the cross country championship in 2015. She won the Tuskys Wareng Cross Country in 2012. Her IAAF Diamond League debut came at the 2014 Athletissima meet. Though she was only seventh at that meet, she had success at lower level meets, with wins at the Meeting Citta di Padova, Spitzen Leichtathletik Luzern and Meeting de Atletismo Madrid. On the roads, she won the Giro Podistico di Pettinengo and the São Silvestre de Luanda.

Sixth place at the Kenyan Cross Country Championships in 2015 brought her her first senior international selection for the world event. After a two-year gap in racing, she returned in 2017 focused on road running, being runner-up at the Azkoitia-Azpeitia Half Marathon and Zwolle Half Marathon. She set a personal best of 1:09:09 hours for the event at the Ústí nad Labem Half Marathon, where she was fourth. She closed the year with a win at the Houilles 10K.

Personal bests
1500 metres – 4:06.10 min (2014)
3000 metres – 8:30.54 min (2014)
5000 metres – 15:15.14 min (2014)
10K run – 31:27 min (2017) 	
Half marathon – 1:09:09 (2017)

International competitions

References

External links

Living people
1992 births
Kenyan female long-distance runners
Kenyan female cross country runners
Commonwealth Games medallists in athletics
Commonwealth Games silver medallists for Kenya
Athletes (track and field) at the 2018 Commonwealth Games
African Championships in Athletics winners
21st-century Kenyan women
Medallists at the 2018 Commonwealth Games